Patricia Sylvester (born 3 February 1983) is a Grenadian long jumper.

Her personal best jump is 6.71 metres, achieved in March 2008 in Atlanta. This is the Grenadian record. She also holds the Grenadian records in the high jump, with 1.85 metres, and the triple jump with 13.87 metres.

Competition record

References

External links

1983 births
Living people
Grenadian long jumpers
Athletes (track and field) at the 2008 Summer Olympics
Olympic athletes of Grenada
Athletes (track and field) at the 2010 Commonwealth Games
Commonwealth Games competitors for Grenada
Grenadian female athletes
Grenadian triple jumpers
World Athletics Championships athletes for Grenada
Canadian Track and Field Championships winners